Aedes (Aedimorphus) alboscutellatus is a species of zoophilic mosquito belonging to the genus Aedes. It is a member in Aedes niveus subgroup. It is found in Sri Lanka, and the Korean peninsula. It is one of the most common indoor human biting mosquitoes in the world with peak biting 20:00-22:00 and 04:00-06:00 hours.

Description
A. alboscutellatus is a medium-sized black mosquito. Scutum with white scales and narrow scales are dark bronze in color. All femurs have characteristic sub-apical band. Proboscis mottled. Wings dark scaled. Adults are closely associated with exposed or partially sun lit forests and temporarily water filled pools in rainy seasons. Larva can be found from shallow pools of natural and man-made structures, both indoor and outdoor.

References

External links
Description Of Aedes (Aedimorphus) Alboscutellatus  In Korea
The Larva and Pupa of Aedes (Aedimorphus) Alboscutellatus (Diptera, Culicidae).
Feeding activities of forest breeding mosquitoes, particular reference to Aedes alboscutellatus.

alboscutellatus
Insects described in 1908